The XXVIII Army Corps (German designation XXVIII. Armeekorps) was a corps which served in Nazi Germany's Wehrmacht during World War II. The corps was created on May 20, 1940 in Wehrkreis III. During the war, the corps was subordinated to the German 6th, 16th, 18th, and 3rd Panzer Armies. In 1945, the corps was briefly named Armeeabteilung Samland (Corps Task Force Samland). The corps fought in Samland until annihilated in late April 1945.

Order of battle
Following is the organization of the corps when it was part of the Eighteenth Army of Army Group North early in 1944:

January 1944
 Commander:  General of the Artillery (Germany) Herbert Loch
 12th Luftwaffe Field Division under Major-General Gottfried Weber
 23rd Field Infantry Regiment
 24th Field Infantry Regiment
 12th Field Artillery Regiment
 13th Luftwaffe Field Division under Lieutenant-General Helmuth Reymann
 25th Field Infantry Regiment
 26th Field Infantry Regiment
 13th Field Artillery Regiment
 German 21st Infantry Division under Lieutenant-General Gerhard Matzky
 3rd Infantry Regiment
 24th Infantry Regiment
 45th Infantry Regiment
 21st Artillery Regiment
 96th Infantry Division (Germany) under Lieutenant-General Richard Wirtz
 283rd Infantry Regiment
 284th Infantry Regiment
 287th Infantry Regiment
 196th Artillery Regiment
 121.Infanterie-Division under Major-General Helmuth Priess
 405th Infantry Regiment
 407th Infantry Regiment
 408th Infantry Regiment
 121st Artillery Regiment

Commanding officers
 General der Infanterie Walter Graf von Brockdorff-Ahlefeldt, 1 June 1940
 General der Artillerie Peter Weyer, 20 June 1940 
 General der Infanterie Mauritz von Wiktorin, 25 November 1940 
 General der Artillerie Herbert Loch, 27 October 1941 
 General der Infanterie Gerhard Matzky, 28 March 1944 
 General der Infanterie Hans Gollnick, 20 May 1944

See also
 Battle of Memel
 Battle of Königsberg
 List of German corps in World War II

Sources 
 Lexikon der Wehrmacht

Army,28
Military units and formations established in 1940
Military units and formations disestablished in 1945